Todd's sirystes (Sirystes subcanescens) is a species of bird in the family Tyrannidae. It was formerly considered conspecific with the sibilant sirystes.

Distribution and habitat
It is found from Guyana throughout northeastern Amazonian Brazil. Its natural habitat is subtropical or tropical moist lowland forests.

References

 Donegan, T.M. 2013b. Vocal variation and species limits in the genus Sirystes (Tyrannidae). Conservacion Colombiana 19: 11–30.
 

Todd's sirystes
Birds of the Guianas
Todd's sirystes
Todd's sirystes